The Venetian–Genoese Wars were a series of struggles between the Republic of Genoa and the Republic of Venice, at times allied with other powers, for dominance in the Mediterranean Sea between 1256 and 1381. There were four bouts of open warfare, in which the fighting between the two republics took place largely at sea. Even during periods of peace, incidents of piracy and other minor outbreaks of violence between the two trading communities were commonplace.

In the first war, in 1256–1270, the Venetians had the better of the fighting, but were unable to prevent the advance of Genoese interests in Byzantium and the Black Sea. The Genoese were overwhelmingly victorious in combat in the second war, 1294–1299. The conflict ended inconclusively, as did the third, 1350–1355, in which Venice fought in conjunction with Aragon and in which the fighting was more evenly balanced.

In the fourth war, 1377–1381, Venice itself was threatened with capture by the Genoese and their allies. Although victorious in the fighting, the exhausted Venetians accepted peace terms which amounted to defeat.

War of 1256–1270

The first full-scale conflict between Genoa and Venice arose from a dispute over prerogatives in Acre, which led to a Genoese attack on the Venetian quarter. The Venetians were supported by the Pisans and Provencals, the Knights Templar and some of the local nobility, while the Catalans, Valencians, Anconitans, Knights Hospitaller and other local nobles joined the Genoese. A fleet sent from Venice under Lorenzo Tiepolo in 1257 defeated a Genoese fleet off Acre when it arrived in June the next year.

In 1261, Venice suffered a major setback with the signing of the Treaty of Nymphaeum between Genoa and the Nicaean emperor Michael VIII Palaiologos, and with Michael's reconquest soon afterwards of the old Byzantine capital of Constantinople from the Latin Empire of Constantinople, effectively a client state of Venice. This permanently destroyed the commercial dominance in the imperial capital and the Black Sea beyond which Venice had enjoyed since the city's capture by the Fourth Crusade in 1204.

Throughout the war, the Venetian navy retained the upper hand over the Genoese in naval combat, as the Genoese navy often avoided battle. The major battles that did occur, at Acre in 1258, at Settepozzi in Euboia in 1263 and off Trapani in Sicily in 1266, were clear Venetian victories. However, the concentration of the Venetian fleet left Genoese commerce largely unmolested, whereas despite the use of convoys their own trade suffered heavily from dispersed Genoese corsairs. The largest Genoese success occurred in 1264, when their admiral Simone Grillo lured away from the Venetian war fleet and captured most of the large convoy left unprotected.

Disputes between the Genoese and Michael VIII enabled the partial restoration of Venice's position and trading rights in the Byzantine Empire, with a truce signed in 1268. The war ended in 1270 with the Peace of Cremona, mediated by Louis IX of France, who wished to embark on a crusade and needed the rival fleets for this undertaking. Venice had strengthened its position in what remained of the Kingdom of Jerusalem, but failed to prevent the revival of Genoese fortunes in the Byzantine world and the establishment of Genoese commercial superiority in the Black Sea, which endured until the Ottoman conquest of Constantinople in 1453.

War of 1294–1299

Continuing rivalry between the two cities led to clashes in 1291 and the formal resumption of war in 1295. Early Venetian victories were overshadowed by late Genoan victories and overall military success on the part of the Genoans, despite suffering heavier damage to their fleet. In 1294 a fleet sent out from Venice was destroyed by a force gathered from Genoa's eastern colonies off the important port of Laiazzo in Cilician Armenia. Civil conflict in Genoa prevented the deployment of a major fleet in 1296, and the unopposed Venetian fleet raided the main Genoese settlements in the eastern Mediterranean, pillaging the suburbs of Phokaia in the Aegean and Caffa in the Crimea, and burning the unwalled settlement of Pera outside Constantinople.

In 1297 the Venetians again refused battle, but they were forced to fight in 1298 when the Genoese fleet under Lamba Doria entered the Adriatic. In the largest battle ever fought between the two republics, off Korcula (Curzola), the Venetian fleet under Andrea Dandolo was destroyed. However, the Genoese, who had suffered heavy casualties and were troubled by continuing domestic conflict in Liguria, returned home rather than advancing against Venice, and a compromise peace was concluded the following year. It was in this war that Marco Polo, fighting for his native Venice, was taken prisoner and while in prison wrote his memoirs.

In 1296 the local Genoese residents of Constantinople destroyed the Venetian quarter and killed many Venetian civilians. Despite the Byzantine–Venetian truce of 1285, the Byzantine emperor Andronikos II Palaiologos immediately showed support for his Genoese allies by arresting the Venetian survivors of the massacre, including the Venetian bailo Marco Bembo.

Venice threatened war with the Byzantine Empire, demanding reparations for the affront they suffered. In July 1296, the Venetian fleet, under command of Ruggiero Morosini Malabranca, stormed the Bosphorus. During the course of the campaign, various Genoese possessions in the Mediterranean and the Black Sea were captured, including the city of Phocaea. The Genoese colony of Galata, across the Golden Horn from the Byzantine capital, was also burned down. The Byzantine basileus, however, preferred at that point to avoid war.

Open war between Venice and the Byzantines did not begin until after the Battle of Curzola and the end of the war with Genoa in the 1299 Treaty of Milan, which left Venice free to pursue her war against the Greeks.

War of 1350–1355

Disputes over Black Sea prompted the outbreak of another war in 1350, in which Venice allied with King Peter IV of Aragon, who was at odds with Genoa over control of Sardinia and the commercial rivalry between his Catalan subjects and the Genoese, and entered the war in 1351.

Following clashes between local forces in the Aegean and around the Bosphorus, in 1351 a major Genoese fleet under Paganino Doria besieged the Venetian colony of Negroponte before advancing to Constantinople. The Byzantine Emperor John VI, who had lost a short war with the Genoese in 1348–1349, had been induced to enter the war on the Venetian side and assisted them in attacks on Pera. A combined Venetian-Catalan fleet under Niccolo Pisani and the Catalan Ponce de Santapau arrived soon afterwards and joined forces with the Byzantines, and the bloody battle of the Straits was fought in the Bosphorus in February 1352. Both sides suffered heavy casualties, but the most serious losses were inflicted on the Catalans, inducing Pisani to withdraw and enabling Doria to force Byzantium out of the war.

In August 1353, Pisani led the Venetians and Catalans to a crushing victory over the Genoese under Antonio Grimaldi off Alghero in Sardinia. Alarmed by the defeat, Genoa submitted to Giovanni Visconti, Lord of Milan, in order to secure his financial support. In 1354 Paganino Doria caught Pisani unprepared in his anchorage at Zonklon (Sapienza) in the Peloponnese and captured the entire Venetian fleet. This defeat contributed to the deposition of doge Marino Faliero, and Venice made peace with Genoa on 1 June 1355. Though inconclusive in itself, Venice's exhaustion by this war helped bring about the loss of Dalmatia to Hungary shortly afterwards. Freed of the need for support from Milan, the Genoese brought an end to Milanese rule in 1356.

War of 1377–1381

In 1376 Venice bought the strategically positioned island of Tenedos near the Dardanelles from the Byzantine Emperor John V, threatening Genoese access to the Black Sea. This induced the Genoese to help John's son Andronikos IV to seize the throne, in return for the transfer of the island to Genoa, initiating a new war between the two republics. The Genoese failed to take Tenedos from the Venetians in 1377, but gained the support of a coalition of Venice's mainland rivals Hungary, Austria, Aquileia and Padua, although only Padua gave substantial assistance. Venice allied with Milan, whose army threatened Genoa from the landward side, and with the Kingdom of Cyprus, which had been defeated in a war with Genoa in 1373-74 and subjected to Genoese hegemony.

A small Genoese fleet led by Luciano Doria invaded the Adriatic in 1378 and defeated the Venetians under Vettor Pisani at Pula in 1379. Having been reinforced, they advanced against Venice under Pietro Doria, Luciano having been killed at Pula. Though failing to break through the defences of the Venetian lagoon, the Genoese captured the port of Chioggia near its southern end, with support from the Paduans on land.

In December 1379 the Venetians were able to sink blockships in the harbour of Chioggia, trapping the Genoese fleet inside. Venice was reinforced by the return of a raiding fleet under Carlo Zeno, which had enjoyed exceptional success against Genoese commerce throughout the Mediterranean. A new Genoese fleet was assembled in the Adriatic, but was unable to break through to relieve Chioggia. The forces trapped inside were forced to surrender in June 1380.

Fighting continued between the Genoese and Venetian fleets over the ports of the upper Adriatic, but through the mediation of Amadeus VI of Savoy, the two sides negotiated peace at Turin in 1381. Despite the victory at Chioggia, the war had been financially disastrous for Venice, which only secured peace by agreeing to concessions including the evacuation of Tenedos, recognition of Genoese supremacy in Cyprus, the surrender of its principal mainland possession of Treviso, and the payment of an annual tribute to Hungary, whereas Genoa and its allies made no significant concessions.

Disengagement
The War of Chioggia left the rivalry between Venice and Genoa unresolved, as had all previous conflicts between them. Venice was left severely debilitated, but was gradually able to rebuild its public finances and to take advantage of the weaknesses of its mainland rivals to redress its losses. Genoa had less success in dealing with the debts accumulated during these wars, and fell into deepening financial incapacity over the following decades. Its chronic political instability became acute after 1390, contributing to the acceptance of French sovereignty in 1396, the first of a series of prolonged bouts of foreign rule during the fifteenth century, which reduced its freedom of action.

These contrasting developments diminished Genoa's capacity to compete with Venice politically, although its commercial fortunes continued to flourish until the middle of the fifteenth century. After 1400, the expansion of Aragonese power in the western Mediterranean posed an increasing threat to Genoa, which led to a series of full-scale wars (1420–26, 1435–44, 1454–58) and remained a major preoccupation until the death of Alfonso V of Aragon in 1458, taking priority over the old rivalry with Venice.

Sporadic piratical violence between Venetians and Genoese continued, notably in the wake of a naval clash at Modon in 1403. During a period of Milanese rule in Genoa, conflict on the Italian mainland between Milan and Venice drew Genoa into another inconclusive naval war with Venice in 1431-33. Nonetheless, the rivalry had ceased to be a dominant consideration in either city's affairs.

Notes

References
 
 
Ostrogorsky, George. History of the Byzantine State, Rutgers University Press, (1969) 
Setton, Kenneth M. Catalan Domination of Athens 1311–1380. Revised edition. London: Variorum, 1975.
Norwich, John Julius. A History of Venice. New York: Alfred A. Knopf, 1982.
Rodón i Oller, Francesch. Fets de la Marina de guerra catalana. Barcelona: 1898.

See also
Byzantine–Venetian War (1296–1302)

 
14th-century conflicts
Wars involving the Byzantine Empire
Wars involving the Crown of Aragon
Wars involving the Republic of Pisa
14th century in the Republic of Venice
14th century in Greece
13th century in the Republic of Venice
13th century in the Republic of Genoa
Wars involving the Republic of Venice
Wars involving the Republic of Genoa
13th-century conflicts